The 1982 Saskatchewan general election was held on April 26, 1982, to elect members of the Legislative Assembly of Saskatchewan.

The Progressive Conservative Party, led by Grant Devine, defeated the New Democratic Party government of Premier Allan Blakeney, which had governed the province since the 1971 election.  The Tories won over half the popular vote, and a large majority in the legislature – the first time that the party had won an outright majority, and making Devine only the second Tory premier in the province's history.  The only other time that the Tories had ever led a government was after the 1929 election, when James Anderson led a coalition government of Conservatives, Progressives and independents.

The NDP vote fell to its lowest level since 1938, and the party lost 35 of its 44 seats in the legislature – the second-worst defeat of a sitting government in the province's history, behind only the Saskatchewan Liberal Party's 38-seat loss in 1944.  The highest-profile casualty was Deputy Premier Roy Romanow, who was ousted by Tory challenger Jo-Ann Zazelenchuk as part of the Tories' sweep of Saskatoon.

This election included the Aboriginal People's Party, a party focused on issues affecting Saskatchewan's First Nations. The APP's best showing would be in the Cumberland district of northeast Saskatchewan, finishing third – ahead of the Liberal candidate.

Popular feelings of alienation in Saskatchewan from Ottawa reached a high point in 1982. The provincial wing of the Western Canada Concept movement won more votes than the Saskatchewan Liberal Party candidate in over a third of Saskatchewan's constituencies; in three ridings the WCC candidate captured more than 1,000 votes. The WCC would disappear by 1988 and be replaced by the Western Independence Party in the 21st century.

Results

|- bgcolor=CCCCCC
!rowspan=2 colspan=2 align=center|Party
!rowspan=2 align=center|Party leader
!rowspan=2|Candidates
!colspan=4 align=center|Seats
!colspan=3 align=center|Popular vote
|- bgcolor=CCCCCC
|align="center"|1978
|align="center"|Dissol.
|align="center"|Elected
|align="center"|% Change
|align="center"|#
|align="center"|%
|align="center"|% Change

|align="center"|Grant Devine
|align="right"| 64
|align="right"|17
|align="right"|15
|align="right"| 55
|align="right"|+266.7%
|align="right"|289,311
|align="right"|54.07%
|align="right"|+15.99%

|align="center"|Allan Blakeney
|align="right"| 64
|align="right"|44
|align="right"|44
|align="right"| 9
|align="right"|-79.5%
|align="right"|201,390
|align="right"|37.64%
|align="right"|-10.44%

|align="center"|Ralph Goodale
|align="right"| 64
|align="right"|–
|align="right"|–
|align="right"| –
|align="right"|–
|align="right"|24,134
|align="right"|4.51%
|align="right"|-9.27%

|align="center"|Ray Bailey
|align="right"| 40
|align="right"|*
|align="right"|*
|align="right"| –
|align="right"|*
|align="right"|17,487
|align="right"|3.26%
|align="right"|* 

| colspan=2 align=left|Independent
|align="right"| 8
|align="right"|–
|align="right"|21
|align="right"| –
|align="right"|-100%
|align="right"|1,607
|align="right"|0.30%
|align="right"|+0.28%

|align="center"|
|align="right"| 10
|align="right"|*
|align="right"|*
|align="right"| –
|align="right"|*
|align="right"|1,156
|align="right"|0.22%
|align="right"|*
|-
|colspan=3| Total
|align="right"| 250
|align="right"|61
|align="right"|61
|align="right"| 64
|align="right"|+4.9%
|align="right"|535,085
|align="right"|100%
|align="right"| 
|-
| align="center" colspan=11|Source: Elections Saskatchewan
|-

Note: * Party did not nominate candidates in previous election.
1Richard Collver and Dennis Ham, MLAs of the short-lived "Unionest Party".

Percentages

Ranking

Riding results
Names in bold represent cabinet ministers and the Speaker. Party leaders are italicized. The symbol " ** " indicates MLAs who are not running again.

Northwest Saskatchewan

Northeast Saskatchewan

|-

|style="width: 130px"|Prog. Conservative
|Sid Dutchak
|align="right"|4,271
|align="right"|55.78%
|align="right"|+13.99

|NDP
|Jerome Hammersmith
|align="right"|3,386
|align="right"|44.22%
|align="right"|+2.32
|- bgcolor="white"
!align="left" colspan=3|Total
!align="right"|7,657
!align="right"|100.00
!align="right"|

West Central Saskatchewan

East Central Saskatchewan

Southwest Saskatchewan

|-

|style="width: 130px"|Prog. Conservative
|Richard Swenson
|align="right"|2,670
|align="right"|42.49%
|align="right"|-19.18

|NDP
|Betty Payne
|align="right"|1,730
|align="right"|27.53%
|align="right"|-0.93

|Liberal
|William Johnstone
|align="right"|1,703
|align="right"|27.10%
|align="right"|+23.41

|WCC
|Henry Banman
|align="right"|181
|align="right"|2.88%
|align="right"|-3.30
|- bgcolor="white"
!align="left" colspan=3|Total
!align="right"|6,284
!align="right"|100.00
!align="right"|

Southeast Saskatchewan

Saskatoon

Regina

|-

|style="width: 130px"|NDP
|Edwin Tchorzewski
|align="right"|5,377
|align="right"|70.97%
|align="right"|+32.46

|Prog. Conservative
|Wilma Staff
|align="right"|1,768
|align="right"|23.34%
|align="right"|-34.05

|Liberal
|Harvey Schick
|align="right"|431
|align="right"|5.69%
|align="right"|+3.76
|- bgcolor="white"
!align="left" colspan=3|Total
!align="right"|7,576
!align="right"|100.00
!align="right"|

See also
List of political parties in Saskatchewan
List of Saskatchewan provincial electoral districts
Saskatchewan Archives Board - Election Results By Electoral Division
Elections Saskatchewan: Provincial Vote Summaries

References

Further reading
 

Saskatchewan
1982 in Saskatchewan
April 1982 events in Canada
1982